The Thai Trade Union Congress (TTUC) is a trade union federation in Thailand. It was founded in 1982 and is affiliated with the International Trade Union Confederation.

References

Trade unions in Thailand
International Trade Union Confederation
1982 establishments in Thailand
Trade unions established in 1982